Gary L. Daniels (born May 16, 1954) is an American Republican politician who served as a member of the New Hampshire Senate from the 11th district. He previously served as a member of the New Hampshire House of Representatives from 1991 to 2000, 2007 to 2012, and 2013 to 2014.

Early life and education 
Daniels was born in Needham, Massachusetts and raised in Milford, New Hampshire. He graduated from the Milford Area High School in 1972 and New Hampshire Technical Institute in 1974. He later earned a Bachelor of Science degree in management and information systems from New Hampshire College in 1982.

Career 
Daniels served in the United States Army from 1976 to 1979, the New Hampshire Army National Guard from 1979 to 1983, and the United States Army Reserve from 1983 to 1988. He has since worked as an insurance agent and served as a member of the Milford Board of Selectmen. Daniels was a member of the New Hampshire House of Representatives from 1991 to 2000, 2007 to 2012, and 2013 to 2014. He served as a member of the New Hampshire Senate from 2014 to 2018 and again starting in 2020.

References 

1954 births
Living people
Republican Party New Hampshire state senators
Republican Party members of the New Hampshire House of Representatives
Southern New Hampshire University alumni
People from Needham Market
People from Milford, New Hampshire